This is a list of United Nations Security Council Resolutions 801 to 900 adopted between 8 January 1993 and 4 March 1994.

See also 
 Lists of United Nations Security Council resolutions
 List of United Nations Security Council Resolutions 701 to 800
 List of United Nations Security Council Resolutions 901 to 1000

0801